Steve Garvey (born 1948) is an American former baseball player.

Steve Garvey may also refer to:

 Steve Garvey (footballer) (born 1973), English former professional footballer
 Steve Garvey (musician) (born 1958), bass guitarist of the punk band Buzzcocks